William Leslie Patton (24 October 1915 – 9 June 1987) was an Australian rules footballer who played with Richmond in the Victorian Football League (VFL).

Patton later served in the Australian Army during World War II.

Notes

External links 

1915 births
1987 deaths
Australian rules footballers from Victoria (Australia)
Richmond Football Club players